RetrOryza is a database of Long terminal repeat-retrotransposons for the rice genome.

See also
 Long terminal repeat
 Retrotransposon
 Rice

References

External links
 http://retroryza.fr/

Biological databases
Molecular genetics
Mobile genetic elements
Rice genetics